Christus: Ein Mysterium in einem Vorspiele und drei Oratorien is a musical composition by Felix Draeseke consisting of a prelude and three oratorios completed in September 1899.

History
It was Felix Draeseke's most impressive accomplishment and took him over thirty years to prepare and five years to compose.  It spans opus numbers 70-73.
Beginning as early as the 1860s, Draeseke and his brother-in-law, the Reverend Adolf Schollmeyer, began gathering ideas for the project.  According to the composer's own program notes:
  
The words of the piece have been taken exclusively from the Holy Scriptures....Individual alterations of minor significance had to be converted to dramatic speech frequently; things not found in the bible only appear very rarely.

Christus was premiered in Berlin in 1912, with Bruno Kittel conducting.  Later that same year, Kittel conducted a second full performance in Dresden; these were the work's only full performances in Draeseke's lifetime. In 1990 and 1991 there have been the next two complete performances in Speyer and Heilbronn, which were a joint-venture of Udo-R. Follert in Speyer, and Hermann Rau in Heilbronn. These performances have been recorded and a CD-Edition was published by Bayer Records.

The suite has been performed by Felix Friedrich, organist from Altenberg, Germany since 1994 (Braunschweig St. Ulrici, Munich St. Bonifaz) and America (Farmington Hills, Michigan and Northville, Michigan). In 1995, at the 9th anniversary of the International Draeseke Society, he played them in the town church of Coburg.

Structure
Christus is composed of four separate sections:
Prelude - The Birth and Death of the Lord
First Oratorio - The manifestation of the Christ
Second Oratorio - Christ the Prophet
Third Oratorio - Death and Triumph of the Lord

Though the work is composed of three oratorios, it bears more resemblance to Wagner's Ring Cycle than to traditional oratorio.  Draeseke intended for it to fit into the category of Wagner's "Musikdrama," and in fact he used leitmotif throughout the work.  Because of its length, a performance of Christus spans three evenings.  The work was only performed twice in its entirety and, unlike Wagner's Ring Cycle, Draeseke preferred that his work be performed in a church.  Draeseke wrote in program notes following the Christus premiere, "The composer never intended his work to be performed on the stage.  It would be contrary to his intentions....A representation in the church would always be preferable to that in the concertroom."
Unlike traditional oratorio, the work contains no narrator, no Evangelist, and no recitative.  Instead, a chorus of 150-200 members serves to advance the plot.

References

External links

Compositions by Felix Draeseke
German-language oratorios
Oratorios
Preludes (music)
1899 compositions